The men's marathon event was held on 8 October 1982. It started and finished at South Bank, next to the Brisbane River in Stanley Street.Brisbane, Australia.

Two of the Tanzanians, Juma Ikangaa and reigning champion Gidamis Shahanga, opened up a large lead (58 seconds at the 30 km mark), but Rob de Castella closed the gap in the final kilometres to win.

Results

References

Results (The Canberra Times)
Australian results 

Athletics at the 1982 Commonwealth Games
1982
Comm
1982 Commonwealth Games